Below is list of Maltese exonyms places that do not use Maltese.

Albania

Algeria

Austria

Belgium

China

Cyprus

Czech Republic

Denmark

Egypt

France

Germany

Greece

Israel and West Bank

Italy

Lebanon

Libya

Netherlands

Poland

Portugal

Romania

Russia

Serbia

South Korea

Spain

Sweden

Switzerland

Syria

Tunisia

United Kingdom

References 

Lists of exonyms
Exonyms